Chitoria fasciola is a species of nymphalid butterfly endemic to China.

References

Apaturinae
Butterflies described in 1890